The Göztepe Şehit Kerem Oğuz Erbay Overpass, commonly known as Güzelyalı Bridge or just the Bridge ), is a  long cable-stayed bridge in İzmir, Turkey. Located in southwest Konak, the bridge is a pedestrian overpass that crosses the Mustafa Kemal Coastal Boulevard. Opened in October 1997, the overpass has become a symbol of Göztepe and its surrounding neighborhoods.

Güzelyalı Bridge was renamed to its current name in 2010, after the death of Private Kerem Oğuz Erbay in a terrorist attack in İskenderun. A large ceremony was held on the bridge for Erbay and Private Serhat Aslan, both İzmir natives, who died in the attack.

References

Bridges completed in 1997
Cable-stayed bridges in Turkey
1997 establishments in Turkey
Buildings and structures in İzmir Province
Pedestrian bridges in Turkey
Konak District